Acacia cavealis is a shrub of the genus Acacia and the subgenus Plurinerves that is endemic to an area along the west coast of Australia.

Description
It has branchlets that are covered in matted hair or with hairs embedded in resin giving them a cobweb-like appearance. Like most species of Acacia it has phyllodes rather than true leaves. The patent to ascending pungent Phyllodes mostly patent to ascending phyllodes are clustered together in groups of two to four on each node, linear. It blooms from November to February and produces yellow flowers.

Distribution
It is native to an area in the Wheatbelt and Mid West regions of Western Australia where it is commonly situated on low rises and sandplains growing in sandy soils.

See also
 List of Acacia species

References

cavealis
Acacias of Western Australia
Taxa named by Bruce Maslin
Plants described in 1999